The 1950–51 Kentucky Wildcats men's basketball team represented University of Kentucky. The head coach was Adolph Rupp. The team was a member of the Southeast Conference and played their home games at Memorial Coliseum. Two members of this team eventually returned to Kentucky as athletic director: Cliff Hagan from 1975 to 1988, and Charles Newton from 1989 to 2000.

Roster

NCAA basketball tournament
Mideast
Kentucky 79, Louisville 68
Kentucky 59, St. John's, New York 43
Final Four
Kentucky 76, Illinois 74
Kentucky 68, Kansas State 58

Rankings

Awards and honors
 Bill Spivey, NCAA Men's MOP Award

Team players drafted into the NBA
No one from the Wildcats men's team was selected in the 1951 NBA draft.

References

Kentucky
Kentucky
Kentucky Wildcats men's basketball seasons
NCAA Division I men's basketball tournament championship seasons
NCAA Division I men's basketball tournament Final Four seasons
1950 in sports in Kentucky
1951 in sports in Kentucky